Deborah McGuire (sometimes referred to as Deboragh McGuire, Debora McGuire, and Deborah McQuire) is an American actress and model.

Career
McGuire is probably best known for appearing as SuperEula in the sexploitation-satire film Supervixens (1975), directed by Russ Meyer. She is also known for her few pictorials in such men's magazines as The BUF Swinger, Gem, and Color Climax.

Personal life
McGuire was married to actor and comedian Richard Pryor from September 22, 1977, to August 1978.

Filmography
 The Godson (1971) as Black Hooker (uncredited)
 The Devil's Garden (1973) as Possessed Cult Member
 Black Starlet (also known as Black Gauntlet) (1974) as Topless Dancer (uncredited)
The Young Secretaries (1974) as Kelly Rogers (credited as Deborah McQuire)
 Supervixens (also known as Russ Meyer's Supervixens; SuperVixens Eruption; and Vixens''') (1975) as SuperEulaFemale Chauvinists (1976) as Gloria (credited as Debora McGuire)''

References

External links

American film actresses
Living people
21st-century American women
Year of birth missing (living people)